Gonzalo Rodríguez Martín-Granizo (died. 16 December 1992), was a admiral general of the Spanish Military in the Spanish Navy, he was the Chief of Defence of Spanish Military (Jemad) in May 1990 until his death in December 1992. He also head the Defence Staff which was between November 1986 — December 1987.

Gonzalo Rodríguez Martín-Granizo was a chief of the Fleet of Spanish Navy. He was born 25 February 1928 in León, Spain and enrolled in the Spanish Military at the age of 18, that was 1946 followed a promotion to second lieutenant in 1951, and served in different battleships, the Almirante Cervera, Sánchez Barcáiztegui ship, Canarias cruiser and Alava destroyer of which he also commands the Marqués de la Ensenada destroyer. He moved to Naval Military School, he also served at the Fleet General Staff, he became the chief of the Strategy Division of the Navy General Staff in 1984 and assistant chief of the Navy General Staff in 1986.

One of his contribution to the Spanish Military was a completed coordination agreement with the NATO when in office and had also supervised the Spanish participation in the Persian Gulf region, Kurdistan and Yugoslavia.

Commands 
He rose to become the chief of the Joint Chiefs of Staff of Defense 1986, a position which is an auxiliary to the Chief of Defence and from which he got promoted to admiral in 1987, that saw him becomes commander of the Fleet and of which he became the Chief of Defense Staff in 1989.  After his demise, the CHOD position was supposed to be occupied by admiral Pedro Regalado Aznar but due eye problem, the Chief of the army (El Jemad) at the time was General Ramón Porgueres later took over the office.

Death 
He died in 1992 after two years in office on a brain hemorrhage injury at Hospital del Aire in Madrid after he was admitted to hospital.

Honors 
In honor to him, a Fleet Headquarters building was renamed after him by the Chief of Naval of Spanish Navy and in count of a honors, he was, on an honorary basis and posthumously promoted to Admiral General of the Navy after his death which was 1999 to serve as a fair recognition of meritorious serving in the Navy.

Notes

References 

1928 births
Chiefs of the Defence Staff (Spain)
1992 deaths
Spanish admirals
Spanish naval officers